Wisdom Tree, Inc. is an American developer of Christian video games. Originally founded in 1988 as Color Dreams, one of the first companies to work around Nintendo's lockout chip technology for the Nintendo Entertainment System, the company changed its focus to Christian games in 1990, changing its name to Wisdom Tree the following year.

History
The company was based in Brea, California, and was started by Daniel Lawton, a self-educated computer programmer and vocal opponent of Nintendo's licensing policy. Founded in 1988, Color Dreams was one of the largest producers of unlicensed games for the NES, but, due to pressure from Nintendo, Color Dreams faced many difficulties getting retailers to stock its games. Although Color Dreams violated no laws in opting out of the Nintendo licensing system with its workaround of Nintendo's lockout chip technology, Nintendo was displeased that it was receiving no revenues from Color Dreams games, and wanted to prevent other companies from following suit. Thus, Nintendo began to threaten to cease selling games to retailers that sold unlicensed NES games.

Because retailers could not afford to stop doing business with Nintendo, unlicensed companies were at a disadvantage. Color Dreams thus had great difficulty getting access to the retail market, and decided to work outside of mainstream NES distribution channels. Also, many of their games were reported to have problems getting to run properly, occasionally even requiring instructions on the cartridge, and were criticized for their lack of quality and gameplay. The problems with running Color Dreams games stemmed from physical changes in later models of the NES; long time Color Dreams employee Vance Kozik (best known as the programmer of Menace Beach) recalled having customers who called Color Dreams read off the serial number of their NES unit so that they could send them a cartridge which would work. The quality issues with the games were in part due to the reverse engineering Color Dreams had to utilize to develop unlicensed NES games, which effectively forced the company's programmers to work within stricter technical limitations than licensed NES developers had to deal with, such as fewer sprites displayed on-screen.

In 1990, Color Dreams began to consider producing games with biblical themes. At the time, there were few religious video games for console systems. Officials at Color Dreams saw that there was a market for them and that many stores that would be most interested in retailing Christian games—Christian bookstores—were likely not to sell video games at all, and thus not vulnerable to pressure from Nintendo. While many Christian bookstores at the time sold much more than books—they also sold religious movies, Contemporary Christian music, and other goods—such stores did not sell video games. In order to convince these stores to sell religious games, Color Dreams changed its name to Wisdom Tree and worked hard to promote this new genre of video games. Wisdom Tree sent Christian bookstores 3-foot Bible Adventures displays, as well as VHS cassettes showing gameplay. These promotional videos made the case to Christian bookstores using lines like: "This game promotes Bible literacy and teaches children about the Bible while they play a 'fun and exciting' Super Mario Bros. style video game." Ultimately, these efforts proved successful, and Color Dreams was able not only to find a new distribution channel for its games, it was also able to launch a new genre of video games, which meant that no other companies competed with its new Wisdom Tree name. Kozik later commented, "No one knew it was going to take off, but it took off like crazy."

Despite producing games for the NES without any official approval, Nintendo never threatened any legal action against Wisdom Tree, as the company probably feared a public relations backlash from parents and religious groups.

Color Dreams also published games under the Bunch Games label, and in 1996 StarDot Technologies, a division of Color Dreams, started selling digital security cameras.

Games
Wisdom Tree's titles always had a Christian theme to them, and were often sold in Christian bookstores. Most games attempted to use the medium to tell Bible stories in such a way as to make them interesting to children of the video game era. Many of their games were partial conversions of titles previously released by Color Dreams, with appropriate changes in theme. A Wisdom Tree product catalog shows screenshots from Joshua & the Battle of Jericho displaying a side-scrolling game using the Bible Adventures engine. The actual released game used the Crystal Mines/Exodus engine.

The company's first release as Wisdom Tree was Bible Adventures, a three-in-one multicart which borrowed many gameplay elements found in the American Super Mario Bros. 2, applied to three different Bible stories: Noah collecting animals for the Ark, saving Baby Moses from the Pharaoh's men, and re-enacting the story of David and Goliath. The game sold 350,000 copies, encouraging the company to continue pursuing this path of making games.

Other Wisdom Tree games included Exodus (a conversion of Color Dreams's old Crystal Mines game, with the story of the Israelites' 40-year desert trek grafted onto it), King of Kings (similar to Bible Adventures, but now featuring three events in the early life of Jesus Christ) and Bible Buffet (a "video board game" with Bible quizzes). They also released Spiritual Warfare, an action-adventure title similar in style to The Legend of Zelda, albeit with the requisite religious theme (the player, as a foot soldier in the Lord's army, is tasked with saving the souls of the heathen populace, using fruit of the spirit). The company also released ports of some of these games to the Sega Genesis and Game Boy, as well as Bible-reading programs (both King James and NIV versions) for Game Boy. Their Sunday Funday, a 1995 conversion of the Color Dreams game Menace Beach, is the last commercial NES release in the United States.

Wisdom Tree holds the distinction of having made the only unlicensed game ever commercially released for the American Super Nintendo Entertainment System, Super 3D Noah's Ark. This conversion of the Wolfenstein 3D engine featured the player as Noah, attempting to quell upset animals on the Ark by flinging sleep-inducing fruit at them. Its shape (the only American SNES cartridge to not use the standard Nintendo-manufactured shell) resembles that of the SNES Game Genie or Sonic & Knuckles on the Sega Genesis, with a pass-through cartridge port at the top; the game requires an "official" Nintendo-licensed cartridge plugged into this pass-through, which allows the game to bypass the SNES's lockout protection and boot up. A PC port of the game was released on Steam in 2015, with retouched features such as support for widescreen resolutions and achievements.

The Wisdom Tree game King of Kings was listed as the honorable mention in Gamespy.com's "Seven Christmas Games That Make You Hate Christmas", due to its unentertaining gameplay and the farcical feel of dodging "acid-spitting camels".

While Color Dreams pamphlets touted a lineup of Genesis games, all of them ports of Amiga games, these were all cancelled. Other unfinished games from the Color Dreams era of Wisdom Tree include a PC game called Hellraiser (another Wolfenstein 3D engine game, it was cancelled upon the release of Doom because Color Dreams felt it could not compete) and an NES game called Maggots, in which the player character is trapped inside a human corpse and must escape while avoiding the maggots which infest it.

Current activities
Wisdom Tree is still active today, mainly licensing the rights to their games to various companies. The company released an all-in-one "TV controller" system featuring seven of their NES games in a single, self-contained unit. They also carry games by other developers on their site. Heaven Bound is one example of a more modern 3D game for the PC. These games are produced on 3D Game Studio (e.g. Joseph and Galilee Flyer by Sunday Software), using the default models that come with the program.

In 2010, all Wisdom Tree NES games were made available through the official Wisdom Tree website in the Arcade Section via vNES, a Java-based NES emulator.

In 2013, retro game publisher Piko Interactive acquired the rights from Wisdom Tree to release cartridge reprints of various Wisdom Tree games. Super 3D Noah's Ark was the first game to go into reprint by Piko Interactive.

In the summer of 2014, retro gaming website Stone Age Gamer began selling licensed T-shirts based on numerous Wisdom Tree properties including: Bible Buffet, Sunday Funday, Super 3D Noah's Ark, and Exodus.

In 2015, a refurbished PC port of Super 3D Noah's Ark was released on Steam through the Steam Greenlight service.

In July 16, 2016 Piko Interactive and Wisdom Tree launched a crowdfunding campaign  on Kickstarter to fund "Wisdom Tree Return with Arkade Plug and Play", with a funding goal of $16,500. It was successfully funded with $25,965 on 341 backers.

On August 4, 2017, Piko Interactive and Wisdom Tree launched another crowdfunding campaign on Kickstarter to fund a physical release of 3 different games (Noah's Ark for NES, Mega 3D Noah's Ark for Genesis, and Wisdom Tree Collection for GBA), with a funding goal of $15,000. It was successfully funded with $17,196 on 200 backers.

References

External links
 Official Wisdom Tree Website
 Interview with WT's owner Brenda Huff

Video game companies of the United States
Video game companies established in 1988
Video game development companies
Video game publishers
 
Christian video games